Hemming is a technology used in the automotive industry to join inner and outer closure panels together (hoods, doors, tailgates, etc.). It is the process of bending/folding the flange of the outer panel over the inner one. The accuracy of the operation significantly affects the appearance of the car’s outer surfaces and is therefore a critical factor in the final quality of a finished vehicle.

Hemming processes

Press hemming
Hemming presses are widely used in automotive manufacturing for hemming of sheet-metal body components. The process uses traditional hydraulically operated ‘stamping presses’ to hem closure parts, and, being the last forming process in stamping, it largely determines the external quality of such automotive parts as doors, hood and trunk lid.

Hemming press features and benefits
 Die storage systems
 Fully automatic die-changing systems with parameters that change with each die
 Pressing capacity typically 60 to 180 tons
 Large panel-size capacity
 More than one part can be produced on same line
 Electric hemmers do not need hydraulic oil, are quiet and eco-friendly

Hemming press limitations
 Restricted to flat, uncomplicated panel profiles
 High cost

Table top hemming
Tabletop hemming machines are utilised for the manufacture of medium to high production volumes, with the ability to achieve cycle times as low as 15 seconds.

Table top features and benefits
 Optimum panel quality guaranteed through the hemming principle of the closed ring

Table top limitations
 Dedicated to one panel
 Relatively high cost
 Cost lower than press hem, but higher than robot roller hem

Robot (roller hemming)

Robot hemming is utilized for the manufacture of Low to medium production volumes. It uses a standard industrial robot integrated with a roller hemming head to provide a flexible method for forming closures. The flange of the outer panel is bent over the inner panel in progressive steps, by means of a roller-hemming head.

One advantage of this process is that it can use the robot-controlled hemming head to hem several different components within a single cell. Another is that minor changes or fluctuations in panel-hemming conditions can be quickly and cost-effectively accommodated. If equipped with a tool-changing system, the robot could serve a variety of additional functions within the same assembly cell, such as operating dispensing equipment for adhesives and sealants, or carrying out panel manipulations, using a gripper unit.

Robot hemming features and benefits
 The ideal solution for all volume production demands, via multiple robots and split operations
 Overall quality better than press or tabletop with MBE hemming technologies implemented 
 Flexibility:
 Robot can hem various panel shapes that press and tabletop can't achieve due to flange attack angles and physical accessibility
 Can perform panel shape changes via quick program changes, while saving the original programs for future recall
 Can perform other tasks by changing the hemming tool with another tool such as a dispensing nozzle 
 Low cost, simple and quiet in operation when used with standard industrial robot 
 Reduced mechanical effort for tryout

See also
 Hemming and seaming
 Sheet metal bending

References

Automotive engineering